Ricardo Bayer (born 1904, date of death unknown) was a Chilean athlete. He competed in the men's hammer throw at the 1928 Summer Olympics.

References

1904 births
Year of death missing
Athletes (track and field) at the 1928 Summer Olympics
Chilean male hammer throwers
Olympic athletes of Chile
Place of birth missing